Artificer may refer to:

 Armed-forces artificer, a service member skilled in working on artillery devices in the field
 Artificer (Dungeons & Dragons), a character class in the Dungeons & Dragons fantasy role-playing game